The 1983 WCT Tournament of Champions, also known by its sponsored name Mercedes Tournament of Champions, was a men's tennis tournament played on outdoor clay courts in Forest Hills, Queens, New York City in the United States that was part of the World Championship Tennis circuit. It was the seventh edition of the tournament and was held from May 1 through May 8, 1983. Second-seeded John McEnroe won the singles title.

Finals

Singles
 John McEnroe defeated  Vitas Gerulaitis 6–3, 7–5
 It was McEnroe's 3rd singles title of the year and the 42nd of his career.

Doubles
 Tracy Delatte /  Johan Kriek defeated  Kevin Curren /  Steve Denton 6–7, 7–5, 6–3

References

External links
 International Tennis Federation (ITF) – tournament edition details

1983 World Championship Tennis circuit
World Championship Tennis Tournament of Champions
WCT Tournament of Champions
WCT Tournament of Champions